Mary Gertrude Anderson (née Gaiser; December 7, 1909 – March 27, 2017) was an American business executive, known for co-founding REI (Recreational Equipment, Inc.) in 1938 with her husband, Lloyd Anderson.

As avid mountaineers in Seattle, Washington, they saw a need for quality gear so created a consumer cooperative company that is one of the largest recreational equipment retailers. They were inducted into the Cooperative Business Association's Hall of Fame in 1993.

In honor of her 100th birthday in 2009, December 7 was "Mary Anderson Day" in Washington state and the city of Seattle.

Family life
Gaiser was born to John and Gertrude Gaiser in Yakima, Washington. In 1932, she married Lloyd Alva Anderson. She died at age 107 in 2017.

See also
Recreational Equipment, Inc.
Lloyd Anderson

References

External links
REI.com

1909 births
2017 deaths
American mountain climbers
American centenarians
Women centenarians
Businesspeople from Washington (state)
People from Yakima, Washington
American company founders
American women company founders
Female climbers
20th-century American businesspeople
20th-century American businesswomen